Guokui, literally "pot helmet", is a kind of flatbread made from flour originating from Shaanxi cuisine.

Variations

The dish is said to have been invented during the Tang Dynasty by a laborer who cooked flatbread in his iron helmet over a wood fire. There are many different versions including Shaanxi, Jingzhou (Hubei), Henan, Sichuan, and Gansu.

Jingzhou style 
Hailing from Jingzhou, Hubei, in this style the dough of flour, water, yeast and sugar is stuffed with either a savoury filling like chicken, beef, and pickled vegetables, or a sweet filling like red bean paste. It is then flattened and cooked until crispy inside a cylindrical charcoal oven.  Since the preparation resembles making Indian naan in a tandoor oven, the dish is sometimes called "Chinese naan"

Shaanxi style
The guokui originated in Shaanxi. In Shaanxi, a guokui is round in shape, about a foot long in diameter, an inch in thickness, and weighs about 2.5 kg. It is traditionally presented as a gift by a grandmother to her grandson when he turns one month old (满月, a traditional custom in Han Chinese).  Along with biang biang noodles, they are considered one of the "Eight/Ten Oddities of Guanzhong".

Gallery

See also
 List of Chinese dishes
 List of pancakes

References

Chinese breads
Shaanxi cuisine
Pancakes